The 2008 World Field Archery Championships were held in Llwynypia & Cardiff, Wales. The qualifying took place in the village of Llwynypia and the final field was situated at the St Fagans National History Museum in Cardiff.

Medal summary (Men's individual)

Medal summary (Women's individual)

Medal summary (Men's Team)

Medal summary (Women's Team)

Medal summary (Men's Juniors)

Medal summary (Women's Juniors)

Medal summary (Junior Men's Team)

Medal summary (Junior Women's Team)

References

E
2008 in British sport
International archery competitions hosted by the United Kingdom
International sports competitions hosted by Wales
World Field Archery Championships